Banjari may refer to:

 Banjari (deity), a Hindu deity
 Banjara, an ethnic group of India
 Banjari language, their language
 Banjari, Bihar, a town in Bihar, India
 Banjari, Gopalganj, a village in Bihar, India